Apostolos K. Doxiadis (born 1953) is a Greek writer. He is best known for his international bestsellers Uncle Petros and Goldbach's Conjecture (2000) and Logicomix (2009).

Early life
Doxiadis was born in Australia, where his father, the architect Constantinos Apostolou Doxiadis was working. Soon after his birth, the family returned to Athens, where Doxiadis grew up. Though his earliest interests were in poetry, fiction and the theatre, an intense interest in mathematics led Doxiadis to leave school at age fifteen, to attend Columbia University, in New York, from which he obtained a bachelor's degree in mathematics. He then attended the École Pratique des Hautes Études in Paris from which he got a master's degree, with a thesis on the mathematical modelling of the nervous system. His father's death and family reasons made him return to Greece in 1975, interrupting his graduate studies. In Greece, although involved for some years with the computer software industry, Doxiadis returned to his childhood and adolescence loves of theatre and the cinema, before becoming a full-time writer.

Work

Fiction in Greek
Doxiadis began to write in Greek. His first published work was A Parallel Life (Βίος Παράλληλος, 1985), a novella set in the monastic communities of 4th-century CE Egypt. His first novel, Makavettas (Μακαβέττας, 1988), recounted the adventures of a fictional power-hungry colonel at the time of the Greek military junta of 1967–1974. Written in a tongue-in-cheek imitation of Greek folk military memoirs, such as that of Yannis Makriyannis, it follows the plot of Shakespeare's Macbeth, of which the eponymous hero's name is a Hellenized form. Doxiadis next novel, Uncle Petros and Goldbach's Conjecture (Ο Θείος Πέτρος και η Εικασία του Γκόλντμπαχ, 1992), was the first long work of fiction whose plot takes place in the world of pure mathematics research. The first Greek critics did not find the mathematical themes appealing, and it received mediocre reviews, unlike Doxiadis's first two works, which were well received. The novella The Three Little Men (Τα Τρία Ανθρωπάκια, 1998), attempts a modern-day retelling of the tale of a classic fairy-tale.

Fiction in English
In 1998, Doxiadis translated into English, significantly re-working, his third novel, which was published in England in 2000 as Uncle Petros and Goldbach's Conjecture (UK publisher: Faber and Faber; United States publisher: Bloomsbury USA.) The book became an international bestseller, and has been published to date in more than thirty-five languages. It has received the praise of, among others, Nobel laureate John Nash, British mathematician Sir Michael Atiyah, critic George Steiner and psychiatrist Oliver Sacks. Uncle Petros is one of the 1001 Books You Must Read Before You Die.
  
Doxiadis' next project, which took over five years to complete, was the graphic novel Logicomix (2009), a number one bestseller on the New York Times Best Seller list and an international bestseller, already published in over twenty languages. Logicomix was co-authored with computer scientist Christos Papadimitriou, with art work by Alecos Papadatos (pencils) and Annie Di Donna (colour). Renowned comics historian and critic R. C. Harvey, in the Comics Journal, called Logicomix "a tour-de-force" a "virtuoso performance", while The Sunday Times Bryan Appleyard called it "probably the best and certainly the most extraordinary graphic novel" he has read. Logicomix is one of Paul Gravett's 1001 Comics You Must Read Before you Die.

Theatre and cinema
In the early stage of his career, Doxiadis directed in the professional theatre, in Athens, and worked as translator, translating, among other plays, William Shakespeare's Romeo and Juliet, Hamlet and Midsummer Night's Dream, as well as Eugene O'Neill's Mourning Becomes Electra.

He has written two plays for the theatre. The first was a full-length shadow-puppet play The Tragical History of Jackson Pollock, Abstract Expressionist (1999), in English, of which he also designed and directed the Athens performance. In this play, Doxiadis realized some of his views on "epic theatre", in other words a theatre based on storytelling. His second play, Incompleteness (2005), is an imaginary account of the last seventeen days in the life of the great logician Kurt Gödel, which Gödel spent in a Princeton, New Jersey, hospital, refusing to eat out of fear that he was being poisoned. The play was staged in Athens, in 2006, as Dekati Evdomi Nyhta (Seventeenth Night) with the actor Yorgos Kotanidis in the role of Kurt Gödel.

Doxiadis has also written and directed two feature-length films, in Greek, Underground Passage (Υπόγεια Διαδρομή, 1983) and Terirem (Τεριρέμ, 1987). The latter won the CICAE (International Confederation of Art Cinemas) prize for Best Film in the 1988 Berlin International Film Festival.

Scholarship
Doxiadis has a lifelong interest in logic, cognitive psychology and rhetoric, as well as the theoretical study of narrative. In 2007, he organized, with mathematician Barry Mazur, a meeting on the theoretical investigation of the relationship of mathematics and narrative, whose proceedings were published as Circles Disturbed: The Interplay of Mathematics and Narrative (2012). Doxiadis has lectured extensively on his theoretical interests. Doxiadis' recent work has led him to formulate a theory about the development of deductive proof in classical Greece, which lays emphasis on influences from pre-existing patterns in narrative and, especially, Archaic Age poetry.

Awards and honours
Uncle Petros and Goldbach's Conjecture was the first recipient of the Premio Peano the first international award for books inspired by mathematics and short-listed for the Prix Médicis. Logicomix has earned numerous awards, among them the Bertrand Russell Society Award, the Royal Booksellers Association Award (the Netherlands), the New Atlantic Booksellers Award (US), the Prix Tangente (France), the Premio Carlo Boscarato (Italy), the Comicdom Award (Greece). It was chosen as "Book of the Year" by Time, Publishers Weekly, The Washington Post, The Financial Times, The Globe and Mail, and other publications.

References

External links
 
 Official Logicomix website

1953 births
Living people
Australian people of Greek descent
Greek autobiographers
Columbia College (New York) alumni
Graphic novelists
Greek biographers
Greek comics writers
Greek dramatists and playwrights
Greek educators
Greek male novelists
Greek mathematicians
Mathematics popularizers
Mathematics and culture
Writers from Athens